The 1993 Manipur riot refers to the Hindu-Muslim riot followed by the large scale deaths of the Meitei Pangals (Meitei Muslims) and the Hindu Meiteis, on 3rd May 1993.
In the past, there has been some land disputes and fear of Bengali Muslim influx.

Incident
There are conflicting accounts of what started the violence, one account says Hindu separatists tried to buy arms from a Muslim arms smuggler and were rebuffed. Another account says that the Hindu rebels were trying to extort from a Muslim village who resisted and killed one of the rebel. The violence started on 3 May 1993 and continued well into 5 May. Bus containing Muslims passengers were set on fire and clashes took places between Pangal and Meitei. An estimated 90 to 130 people were killed. The Manipur Government worked with the people of Manipur to restore peace in the State following the riots.

Legacy
According to an official of the Indian Government, about a 100 people died in the riots. The commission called for increased security and increasing the compensation award to the victims. The Pangal (Manipuri Muslim) Political Forum claimed 140 people were killed. Following the Government of India awarded compensation to the victims of the 1984 Punjab riots, the Pangal (Manipuri Muslim) Political Forum demanded compensation from the government in January 2015 at the Manipur Press Club.

The Day, 3 May 1993, is marked as a black day/Sahidee Memorial Day by the Pangals. Following the massacre the Pangals formed a number of armed militias.</ref> The day is observed by All Manipur Muslim Students’ Organization, Pangal (Manipur Muslim) Political Forum, and All Manipur Muslim Girl Students’ Organization.

References

1993 in Islam
1993 riots
Violence against Hindus in India
Massacres in 1993
Riots and civil disorder in India
Religious riots
Religiously motivated violence in India
Mass murder in 1993
Anti-Muslim violence in India
Persecution by Hindus
May 1993 events in Asia
Massacres in India
1993 crimes in India
1993 murders in Asia
Massacres of  Hindus
Persecution by Muslims
Meitei people
Meitei Pangals
Massacres of Muslims